York Institute of Art, Science and Literature is a Grade II listed building at 12 Clifford Street, York.

History and architecture

The foundation stone for the building was laid by the Prince of Wales on 18 July 1883 in a ceremony of masonic ritual.  The architect was Walter Green Penty.

The building was opened by the Marquis of Lorne on 10 June 1885. The principal frontage is on Clifford Street. The basement contained a gymnasium and two small class rooms. The main floor contained a hall with a capacity of 500 people, and a lecture theatre, class room, two reading rooms, a council room and offices. The first floor contained three more class rooms.

Later in life the building was taken over and used as York Technical College.

References

Grade II listed buildings in York
Buildings and structures completed in 1885